This is the discography of English indie pop band the Primitives.

Albums

Studio albums

Compilation albums

Box sets

EPs

Singles

Notes

References

Discographies of British artists
Pop music group discographies
Rock music group discographies
New wave discographies